Den König segne Gott (lit: God bless the King) was, though not officially declared the national anthem, historically assumed the anthem of Saxony.

History 
The lyrics were written by Georg Karl Alexander von Richter and were sung for the first time on June 5, 1815. It was published as a soldier's song in 1883 by a bookseller, Ernst Röthke in Berlin. The lyrics were very similar to the British original.

Lyrics

References 
Original source of the page (in German)

Anthems
Saxony